Chambersburg is an unincorporated community in Clark County, in the U.S. state of Missouri.

History
A post office called Chambersburg was established in 1849, and remained in operation until 1904. The community most likely was named after Chambersburg, Pennsylvania, the native home of a share of the first settlers.

References

Unincorporated communities in Clark County, Missouri
Unincorporated communities in Missouri